Dan Stover (born 1951) is a public educator, who ran as a Democrat for Congress in Illinois' 19th CD (map) against Republican John Shimkus. Stover was a professor and department chair at Kaskaskia College. Stover was also a member of the Centralia City Council. He is currently on the Marion County Board

While at Kaskaskia College Stover was head of the International Friends club, a group which raises money to send students on a study trips abroad annually. In 2003 the group traveled to England, France, Belgium, and the Netherlands.  

Stover's opponent, Shimkus, played a role in the Mark Foley scandal in his capacity as chairman of the Page Committee, in which he talked to Representative Foley about emails that Foley had sent in 2005 to a former page. Shimkus was considered a shoo-in for re-election until the scandal broke.

External links
DCCC webpage on the race
Campaign website

1951 births
Living people
Illinois Democrats